Lord Melville was launched at Quebec in 1807. She was re-registered at London on 4 March 1808. She entered Lloyd's Register (LR) in 1808.

The boatswain had gone to the spirits room with a lighted candle that ignited the fumes and started the fire. He died in the incident. The remaining 26 people on board took to her boats and were able to leave before she blew up.

Register of Shipping for 1809 carried the annotation "Burnt" by her name.

Citations

References
 

1807 ships
Ships built in Quebec
Age of Sail merchant ships of England
Maritime incidents in 1809
Ship fires
Ships sunk by non-combat internal explosions
Shipwrecks in the Atlantic Ocean